Paul Camenisch (7 November 1893 – 13 February 1970) was a Swiss expressionist painter, architect and illustrator. He was the founding member of the Rot-Blau group and Gruppe 33.

Biography
In 1912–16, he studied architecture at ETH Zurich under Karl Moser.
He was influenced by the German expressionist painter Ernst Ludwig Kirchner. In 1924, Camenisch founded the "Rot-Blau" expressionist group with Albert Müller and Hermann Scherer.

Two of his works are in the Museo Cantonale d'Arte in Lugano.

References

Bibliography

External links

This article was initially translated from the German Wikipedia.

20th-century Swiss painters
Swiss male painters
Romansh people
1893 births
1970 deaths
20th-century Swiss male artists